Sir Miles Sandys ( – 1636) was an English politician and author, MP for Cirencester in  1625.

Sandys was the son of Sir William Sandys (son of Miles Sandys , himself brother of Edwin Sandys, Archbishop of York), and his wife Margaret, daughter of Walter Culpeper. His younger brother was William Sandys , the waterways engineer known as "Waterworks Sandys".

He was educated at Hart Hall, Oxford, matriculating in 1616 aged 15, not taking a degree. He entered the Middle Temple as a student in 1618.

He was knighted on 8 June 1619.

On 4 November 1622 he married Mary Hanbury, daughter of Sir John Hanbury. They had one daughter and three sons:
 Mary Sandys
 William Sandys (died 1649)
 Edward Sandys
 Miles Sandys

Sandys was elected MP for Cirencester in the Useless Parliament of 1625. The Parliament was dissolved by King Charles I after sitting for less than three months; Sandys left no mark on the parliamentary records.

He was the author of the treatise Prudence, published in two editions in 1634, which accounts for prudence as comprising memory, understanding and providence.

References

1600s births
Year of birth uncertain
1636 deaths
Alumni of Hart Hall, Oxford
Members of the Middle Temple
English MPs 1625
Members of Parliament for Cirencester
English knights